The Nebraska Public Service Commission regulates railroads, household goods and passenger carriers, telephone companies, grain warehouses and construction of manufactured housing (mobile homes).

The Nebraska PSC is composed of five commissioners.  The current commissioners, as of 2019, are Dan Watermeier, Crystal Rhoades, Tim Schram, Rod Johnson and Mary Ridder.

External links
 Nebraska Public Service Commission Website

Nebraska
State agencies of Nebraska